The Wisconsin Shipwreck Coast National Marine Sanctuary is one of 15 United States National Marine Sanctuaries administered by the National Oceanic and Atmospheric Administration (NOAA), an agency of the United States Department of Commerce; NOAA co-manages the sanctuary jointly with the State of Wisconsin. It is located in Lake Michigan along the coast of Wisconsin. It was created in 2021 to protect shipwrecks considered nationally important archaeological resources.

Description

The Wisconsin Shipwreck Coast National Marine Sanctuary covers approximately 726 square nautical miles   in Lake Michigan off Wisconsin's Ozaukee, Sheboygan, Manitowoc, and Kewaunee counties. Principal cities along the coast include Port Washington, Sheboygan, Manitowoc, and Two Rivers, Wisconsin.

The wrecks provide a cross-section of the types of ships that connected Wisconsin with other Great Lakes ports between the early 1800s and the 20th century. Archival research indicated that the sanctuary could include another 59 or 60 such shipwrecks (sources provide both figures) that had yet to be discovered. Twenty-one of the known shipwrecks were listed on the National Register of Historic Places. Thanks to the cold, fresh water of Lake Michigan, several of the known shipwrecks were essentially intact and looked much like they did when they sank.

NOAA and the State of Wisconsin jointly manage the sanctuary.

History

In 2008, the Wisconsin Historical Society published a report titled "Wisconsin's Historic Shipwrecks: An Overview and Analysis of Locations for a State/Federal Partnership with the National Marine Sanctuary Program, 2008." Drawing on this report, the State of Wisconsin on December 2, 2014, submitted a nomination asking NOAA to consider designating the area as a national marine sanctuary. On February 5, 2015, NOAA added the area to its inventory of nominated areas eligible for designation as national marine sanctuaries. On October 7, 2015, NOAA announced its intention to designate the area as a sanctuary, and on January 9, 2017, it published a notice of its intention to designate a  area as the Wisconsin-Lake Michigan National Marine Sanctuary. NOAA published an environmental impact statement and final management plan in June 2020, designated the area as a sanctuary on June 22, 2021,  and published the designation in the Federal Register on June 23, 2021. The designation was to take effect formally in the autumn of 2021 following 45 days of continuous session of the United States Congress after publication of the designation in the Federal Register. After the 45-day review period in Congress was complete, the designation became final on October 9, 2021. The Wisconsin Shipwreck Coast National Marine Sanctuary was the first national marine sanctuary created in the United States since the designation of Mallows Bay, Maryland, as a sanctuary in 2019.

Upon designating the area as a sanctuary, NOAA announced that it would stay a prohibition on grappling into or anchoring on shipwreck sites in the sanctuary until October 1, 2023. The delay in the imposition of this regulation was intended to give NOAA time to install mooring buoys that would make anchoring or grappling unnecessary, establish policies allowing access to shipwrecks where mooring buoys would not be installed, and explore the possibility of allowing some diving activities it originally intended to prohibit, such as allowing divers to attach mooring lines directly to some shipwrecks. The designation is the second of its kind for the Great Lakes and the first for Lake Michigan.

References

External links
 
 NOAA video "Designation of Wisconsin Shipwreck Coast National Marine Sanctuary" on YouTube
 NOAA video "Wisconsin Shipwreck Coast National Marine Sanctuary B-roll" on YouTube
 NBC 26 video "Wisconsin Shipwreck Coast becomes the 15th National Marine Sanctuary" on YouTube

National Marine Sanctuaries of the United States
National Marine Sanctuaries of Wisconsin
Protected areas of Kewaunee County, Wisconsin
Protected areas of Manitowoc County, Wisconsin
Protected areas of Ozaukee County, Wisconsin
Protected areas of Sheboygan County, Wisconsin
2021 establishments in Wisconsin